Kai von Warburg (born 10 March 1968) is a German lightweight rower. He won a gold medal at the 1991 World Rowing Championships in Vienna with the lightweight men's double scull.

References

1968 births
Living people
German male rowers
World Rowing Championships medalists for Germany